The Misuse of Drugs Act 1973 is a drug control law in Singapore classifying substances into three categories, Classes A, B, and C. Section 44 provides that "The Minister may, by an order published in the Gazette" add, remove, or transfer drugs among the classes. The statute's penal provisions are severe by most nations' standards, providing for long terms of imprisonment, caning, and capital punishment. The law creates a presumption of trafficking for certain threshold amounts, e.g. 30 grams of cannabis. It also creates a presumption that a person possesses drugs if he possesses the keys to a premises containing the drugs, and that "Any person found in or escaping from any place or premises which is proved or presumed to be used for the purpose of smoking or administering a controlled drug shall, until the contrary is proved, be presumed to have been smoking or administering a controlled drug in that place or premises." Thus, one runs the risk of arrest for drug use by simply being in the company of drug users. The law also allows officers to search premises and individuals, without a search warrant, if he "reasonably suspects that there is to be found a controlled drug or article liable to seizure". Moreover, Section 31 allows officers to demand urinalysis of suspected drug offenders while section 8A prohibits any citizen or permanent resident of Singapore to use any prohibited drug outside of the country, and if found guilty to be punished as if they committed that act within the country.

Thresholds
Section 17 of the Misuse of Drugs Act lists the amount of controlled drugs beyond which, the person who carries them shall be presumed to possess them for the purpose of drug trafficking unless proven otherwise:

The possession, consumption, manufacturing, import, export, or trafficking of these and other controlled drugs in any amount are illegal. Persons caught with less than the Mandatory Death Penalty amounts of these controlled substances face penalties ranging from caning (up to 24 strokes) to life in prison. Pursuant to a law change in 2009, cannabis (marijuana) and marijuana mixtures (diluted with other substances) are treated the same under Singapore law—the presumed intent is trafficking.

Schedule I – Controlled Drugs

Class A – Part I

Some examples include:
Amphetamine
Buprenorphine
Cannabinol (and derivatives)
Cannabis (marijuana)
Cathinone and methcathinone
Cocaine (in all forms, including coca leaf)
Desomorphine
Dimethyltryptamine (DMT)
Ecgonine (any derivative of ecgonine which is convertible to ecgonine or to cocaine)
Fentanyl (and all its analogues, i.e. alphamethylfentanyl (AMF; China White), alfentanil, sufentanil, carfentanil, etc.)
GHB
Ketamine
Lysergic acid diethylamide (LSD), and other lysergides 
MDMA (ecstasy)
Mescaline
Methamphetamine
Methaqualone
Morphine, heroin, methadone and oxycodone
Nimetazepam
Opium
Psilocin and psilocybine (psilocybin mushrooms)
Salvinorin A (salvia divinorum)
Temazepam

Class B – Part II
Some examples include:

Acetyldihydrocodeine
Codeine
Dextropropoxyphene
Dihydrocodeine
Ethylmorphine
Methylphenidate (ritalin)
Nicocodeine
Phencyclidine (PCP)
Pholcodine
Zipeprol

Class C – Part III
Benzphetamine
Chlorphentermine
Flunitrazepam (rohypnol)
Mecloqualone
Mephentermine
Nimetazepam
Phendimetrazine
Pipradrol
Secobarbital
Triazolam (halcion)

Part IV
For the purposes of this Paragraph:

 cannabinol derivatives means the following substances, namely tetrahydro derivatives of cannabinol and their carboxylic acid derivatives, and 3-alkyl homologues of cannabinol or its tetrahydro derivatives;
 coca leaf means the leaf of any plant of the genus Erythroxylon from whose leaves cocaine can be extracted either directly or by chemical transformation;
 concentrate of opium poppy-straw means the material produced when poppy-straw has entered into a process for the concentration of its alkaloids;
 opium poppy means any plant from which morphine may be produced;
 preparation means a mixture, solid or liquid, containing a controlled drug;
 poppy-straw means all parts, except the seeds, of the opium poppy, after mowing.

Schedule II – Offences Punishable on Conviction

Schedule III

Controlled equipment, materials or substances useful for manufacturing controlled drugs

 Part I
1-Phenyl-2-propanone also known as Phenylacetone
3,4-methylenedioxyphenyl-2-propanone
Camazepam (may be used to manufacture temazepam also known as (9-chloro-2-methyl-3-oxo-6-phenyl-2,5-diazabicyclo[5.4.0]undeca-5,8,10,12-tetraen-4-yl) N,N-dimethylcarbamate
Clonazepam also known as 6-(2-chlorophenyl)-9-nitro-2,5-diazabicyclo[5.4.0]undeca-5,8,10,12-tetraen-3-one
Diazepam (may be used to manufacture temazepam) also known as 7-chloro-1-methyl-5-phenyl-1,3-dihydro-2H-1,4-benzodiazepin-2-one
Ephedrine also known as (1R,2S)-2-(methylamino)-1-phenylpropan-1-ol
Ergometrine also known as Ergonovine or Ergobasine
Ergotamine also known as Ergotaman-3',6',18-trione, 12'-hydroxy-2'-methyl-5'-(phenylmethyl)-, (5'-alpha)- (9CI)
Estazolam (may be used to manufacture triazolam) also known as 8-Chloro-6-phenyl-4H-1,2,4-triazolo(4,3-a)-1,4-benzodiazepine
Isosafrole also known as 1,2-(Methylenedioxy)-4-propenylbenzene
Lorazepam (may be used to manufacture temazepam) also known as 9-chloro-6-(2-chlorophenyl)-4-hydroxy-2,5-diazabicyclo[5.4.0]undeca-5,8,10,12-tetraen-3-one
Lormetazepam (may be used to manufacture temazepam) also known as 9-chloro-6-(2-chlorophenyl)-4-hydroxy-2-methyl-2,5-diazabicyclo[5.4.0]undeca-5,8,10,12-tetraen-3-one
Lysergic acid also known as 9,10-didehydro-6-methylergoline-8-carboxylic acid
N-acetylanthranilic acid also known as N-Acetyl-o-aminobenzoic acid
Nitrazepam (may be used to manufacture flunitrazepam and nimetazepam) also known as 9-nitro-6-phenyl-2,5-diazabicyclo[5.4.0]undeca-5,8,10,12-tetraen-3-one
Oxazepam (may be used to manufacture temazepam) also known as 9-chloro-4-hydroxy-6-phenyl-2,5-diazabicyclo[5.4.0]undeca-5,8,10,12-tetraen-3-one
Piperonal also known as 3,4-(Methylenedioxy)benzaldehyde or Piperonylaldehyde
Prazepam (may be used to manufacture flutoprazepam) also known as 9-chloro-2-(cyclopropylmethyl)-6-phenyl-2,5-diazabicyclo[5.4.0]undeca-5,8,10,12-tetraen-3-one
Pseudoephedrine also known as β-Hydroxy-N-methylamphetamine
Safrole also known as 4-Allyl-1,2-methylenedioxybenzene
Part II
Acetic anhydride also known as Acetic oxide
Acetone also known as 2-Propanone or Dimethyl ketone
Anthranilic acid also known as o-Aminobenzoic acid
Ethyl ether also known as Ether or Diethyl ether or Ethyl oxide or Diethyl oxide or Ethoxyethane or 1, 1'-Oxybisethane
Hydrochloric acid
Methyl ethyl ketone also known as 2-Butanone
Phenylacetic acid also known as Benzeneacetic acid or a-Toluic acid
Piperidine also known as Hexahydropyridine
Potassium permanganate
Sulphuric acid
Toluene also known as Methylbenzene or Phenylmethane

See also
Capital punishment in Singapore
Capital punishment for drug trafficking
Criminal law of Singapore
Law of Singapore
Ong Ah Chuan v. Public Prosecutor
History of opium in Singapore

References

External links
 
 Singapore Anti Narcotics Association
 Misuse of Drugs Act 1973 (2020 Rev. Ed.)

1973 in law
1973 in Singapore
Singaporean criminal law
Drug control law
Drug policy of Singapore